Beanibazar Gas Field is a natural gas field at Sylhet, Bangladesh. It is controlled by Sylhet Gas Fields Limited.

Location
Beanibazar Gas Field is located at Jalup Mouza (Location-1) of Mollapur Union and Suptala Village (Location-2) of the Municipality of Beanibazar Upazila of Sylhet.

See also 
List of natural gas fields in Bangladesh
Bangladesh Gas Fields Company Limited
Gas Transmission Company Limited

References 

1981 establishments in Bangladesh
Economy of Sylhet
Natural gas fields in Bangladesh
Beanibazar Upazila